The Arab Chess Federation (ArabFide) is a non-profit organization that promotes chess within the Arab world. Though unaffiliated with the Arab League, it includes 18 of the latter's member states.

History
Formed on July 27, 1975, in Damascus, Syria, the federation was established under the motto "Arab as one Nation". Nahed El Khany was the organization's first president.

In 2015, the Arab Chess Federation co-organized the first edition of the Arab Chess Olympiad Championships in Agadir, Morocco.

Governance
President: Ibrahim Mohammed El-Bannay
Official representatives:
 – Abd-Ul-Malik Arafat
 – Mohammed Ali El-Mehrezy
 – Hossam El-Din Menaqly
 – Rashid El-Rahmany
 – Mohammed Mourad Soukar
 – Mohammed Shokry Shahin
 – Ellowa Ismail Mekkey
Members:

 – Qatar Chess Federation

 – UAE Chess Federation

References

External links
Official Website

Arab organizations
Chess organizations
1975 in chess
Sports organizations established in 1975
Chess in Asia
Chess in Africa